"Lucid" (stylised in all caps) is a song by Japanese-British singer-songwriter Rina Sawayama, released on 25 November 2020 as the sixth overall and first single from the deluxe edition of her debut studio album Sawayama. Sawayama first teased a collaboration with BloodPop on 2 October 2020, Tweeting out "BloodPop X Rina Sawayama Coming Soon" alongside a Polaroid picture with the words "Lucid Mix" written on it.

Background and composition
The dance-pop song is about "living a different life through dreaming". It was written by Sawayama and Lauren Aquilina in 2018 on the floor of the singer's apartment from a beat sent to them by BloodPop. The song has been described as "Gaga-esque" and garnered comparisons to the singer's 2020 album Chromatica, also produced by BloodPop.

Music video 
The video was directed by Dave Ferner and Ksenia Kulakova, and was filmed at MARS Studios, owned by Bild Studios, in London, with all staff observing COVID-19 protocols during production. The video was filmed using a virtual production set, with scenes created in Blender and filmed using an LED projection screen.

In popular culture 
The song was used in the third episode of the Netflix series Heartstopper and subsequently appeared on the Heartstopper: Official Mixtape released by Spotify.

References 

Rina Sawayama songs
2020 songs
2020 singles
Dirty Hit singles
Dance-pop songs
Songs written by BloodPop
Songs written by Rina Sawayama
Songs written by Lauren Aquilina